The 2021–22 Supercopa de España was the 38th edition of the Supercopa de España, an annual football competition for clubs in the Spanish football league system that were successful in its major competitions in the preceding season.

After last season's edition was held in Spain due to travel restrictions related to the COVID-19 pandemic, this year the tournament returned to Saudi Arabia as per the deal with the Royal Spanish Football Federation.

Real Madrid won the tournament for their twelfth Supercopa de España title.

Qualification
The tournament featured the winners and runners-up of the 2020–21 Copa del Rey and 2020–21 La Liga.

Qualified teams
The following four teams qualified for the tournament.

Matches
 Times listed are UTC+3.
 All three matches were held in King Fahd International Stadium in Riyadh, Saudi Arabia.

Bracket

Semi-finals

Final

See also 
2021–22 La Liga
2021–22 Copa del Rey

References

2021–22 in Spanish football cups
2021–22
January 2022 sports events in Saudi Arabia
International club association football competitions hosted by Saudi Arabia
2021–22 in Saudi Arabian football
2022 in Saudi Arabia
21st century in Riyadh